Dr. Norbert Bischofberger (born 10 January 1956 in Mellau, Austria) is an Austrian scientist and one of the inventors of the antiviral drug Tamiflu generically known as oseltamivir, which is, as of 2009, the only oral medication on the market to treat influenza A and B as well as the 2009 Pandemic H1N1 (swine flu), the spread of which caused an ongoing pandemic in 2009. Bischofberger was the Executive Vice President, Research and Development and Chief Scientific Officer at Gilead Sciences, a biopharmaceutical company specializing in antivirals.

Education
Bischofberger has received a Bachelor of Science in Chemistry from the University of Innsbruck, a Ph.D. in Organic Chemistry at the ETH Zurich with Oskar Jeger, and has done postdoctoral work at Harvard University with George M. Whitesides and Syntex Research.

Tamiflu
He worked as part of the DNA synthesis group at Genentech from 1986–1990, before joining Gilead in 1990 as Director of Organic Chemistry. In 1993, he began work, as head of a team, to create Tamiflu. In 1996, clinical studies were carried out on the drug, which was the first orally active commercially developed anti-influenza medication. Explaining the motivation behind this, he said, "We decided to create a pill and not a medication to inhale because especially people who suffer from influenza struggle with breathing difficulties. And the agent would only reach the lung," Three years later, the right to market and develop Tamiflu were sold to Roche, with Bischofberger and Gilead retaining the intellectual rights to it.

Bischofberger has publicly displayed pessimism over the risk viruses pose, saying, "I think the threat by new bacterial or viral agents is higher than the potential of a nuclear war."

Other activities
 Morphic Therapeutics, Member of the Board of Directors (since 2019)
 Bayer, Member of the Supervisory Board (since 2017)
 InCarda Therapeutics, Member of the Board of Directors (since 2016)
 Kronos Bio, Member of the Board of Directors

References

External links
Forbes.com profile

Austrian scientists
Austrian chemists
Organic chemists
Austrian pharmacologists
Living people
1954 births